The Miggiano-Specchia-Montesano railway station is a railway station in Miggiano, Italy, built to serve the towns of Miggiano, Specchia and Montesano Salentino. The station is located on the Maglie-Gagliano del Capo railway. The train services are operated by Ferrovie del Sud Est.

Train services
The station is served by the following service:

Local services (Treno regionale) Zollino - Maglie - Tricase - Gagliano

References

Railway stations in Apulia
Railway stations opened in 1910
Buildings and structures in the Province of Lecce